John Somers Somers-Cocks, 2nd Earl Somers (19 March 1788 – 5 October 1852), styled Viscount Eastnor between 1821 and 1841, was a British peer and Conservative Party politician.

Somers was the second son of John Cocks, 1st Earl Somers; his older brother Edward Charles Cocks died in the Peninsular War. He was educated at Westminster, entered the British Army and served in the Peninsula War. Somers sat as Member of Parliament for Reigate between 1812 and 1818 (succeeding his elder brother) and again between 1832 and 1841 and for Hereford between 1818 and 1832. In 1841 he succeeded his father in the earldom.

References

G. E. C., ed. Geoffrey F. White. The Complete Peerage. (London: St. Catherine Press, 1953) Vol. XII, Part 1, p. 33–34.

External links 

1788 births
1852 deaths
2
UK MPs 1812–1818
UK MPs 1818–1820
UK MPs 1826–1830
UK MPs 1830–1831
UK MPs 1831–1832
UK MPs 1832–1835
UK MPs 1835–1837
UK MPs 1837–1841
Somers, E2
Conservative Party (UK) MPs for English constituencies
Tory MPs (pre-1834)